Louis Emilio Saavedra (March 18, 1933 – August 7, 2009) was an American politician and educator who served as the 25th mayor of Albuquerque, New Mexico. A member of the Democratic Party, he served as mayor from December 1989 until November 1993.

Early life and education 
Born in Socorro, New Mexico, Saavedra attended Socorro High School. For post-secondary education, Saavedra received two degrees from Eastern New Mexico University.

Career 
He later went on to a career in education in Albuquerque, and eventually ran for and won mayorship of Albuquerque in 1989. Saavedra founded the Albuquerque Technical Vocational Institute in 1964, and was its president until he was elected mayor of Albuquerque.

Death 
On August 7, 2009, Saavedra died from brain cancer in Albuquerque.

References

1933 births
2009 deaths
20th-century American politicians
Mayors of Albuquerque, New Mexico
New Mexico Democrats
Deaths from brain cancer in the United States
Deaths from cancer in New Mexico
Eastern New Mexico University alumni
Educators from New Mexico
People from Socorro, New Mexico